Trefilov is a Russian masculine surname, its feminine counterpart is Trefilova. It may refer to
Andrei Trefilov (born 1969), Russian ice hockey goaltender and a sports agent
Dmitrijs Trefilovs (born 1987), Latvian gymnast
Georgy Trefilov (born 1971), Russian businessman
Natalia Trefilova (born 1971), Russian swimmer
Vera Trefilova (1875–1943), Russian dancer 
Vladimir Trefilov (born 1949), Russian scholar 
Yevgeni Trefilov (born 1955), Russian handball coach 

Russian-language surnames